Meadow Lake is a small, shallow, oval-shaped lake that is the source of Meadow River and the namesake of Meadow Lake Provincial Park, despite not being within the park's boundaries. The lake is in the transition zone between the boreal forest and prairies ecozones of Canada.

Meadow Lake is situated in the RM of Meadow Lake with the city of Meadow Lake located along the western shore and Flying Dust First Nation located along the north-west shore, adjacent to the city. Highway 55 runs along the northern shore and Highway 799, the southern shore. Highway 4 is west of the lake and provides access to the city.

History

Peter Fidler was the first European to discover the lake. He was a Hudson's Bay employee who was exploring and mapping the region in 1799 and upon the lake's discovery, he named it Lac des Prairies and built a 12 foot by 12 foot log fort. He named the fort Bolsover House, after his home town of Bolsover in England. It lasted only one season before being abandoned and relocated to Green Lake House. While the exact location of the trading post is unknown, it is believed to be near the spot where Meadow River flows out of the lake. A monument was erected in Meadow Lake's Elk's Park in 1955 by the Government of Canada to pay homage Peter Fidler.

Description
Meadow Lake is the remnants of a once vast glacial lake called Glacial Meadow Lake that existed near the end of the last ice age over 10,000 years ago.

Meadow River, located at the north-west corner of the lake, is Meadow Lake's outflow. Meadow River flows generally north-east until it meets Beaver River, which flows into Lac Île-à-la-Crosse, which is a lake along the course of the Churchill River–a major tributary of the Hudson Bay drainage basin.

Meadow Lake is situated north of the Meadow Lake Escarpment. A large part of the northern slope of the escarpment is within the lake's catchment and was also the southern limit of Glacial Meadow Lake. The following rivers and creeks flow into Meadow Lake:
Nolin Creek
Chitek River, which starts at Chitek Lake
Lavigne River
Alcott Creek
Sulby Creek
Myo Creek

See also
List of lakes of Saskatchewan
Geography of Saskatchewan
North American fur trade

References

Lakes of Saskatchewan
Meadow Lake No. 588, Saskatchewan
Division No. 17, Saskatchewan